Possessing Ruby Lin is a 2004 album by Taiwanese pop singer Ruby Lin. Compilation album which presents two new songs and 14 of her tunes.

Track listing
 爱一个人快乐 Love One's Happiness
 放心一博 Give it a Go
 半生缘 18 Springs
 擦身而过 We passed by each other
 爱再靠近一点 Love, Move a little Closer
 投怀送抱 Falling into your arms
 云深深雨蒙蒙 Dense Cloud, Misty Rain
 夜宿兰桂坊 Overnight in Lan Kuai Fong
 冬眠地图 Hibernating Map
 新浪漫 New Romance
 一百八十分钟零七秒 180 Minutes and 7 Seconds
 采心 Harvesting Hearts
 笑话 Joke
 生死相许 Till Death Do Us Part

Trivia
 Format : 1CD+1DVD-5
 Ruby Lin's last album with BMG Taiwan.

References

2004 albums
Ruby Lin albums